Tân Thành Bình is a rural commune of Mỏ Cày Bắc District, Bến Tre Province, Vietnam. The commune covers 18.33 km2, with a population of 12,968 in 1999, and a population density of 707 inhabitants/km2.

References

 

Communes of Bến Tre province
Populated places in Bến Tre province